Nynetjer (also known as Ninetjer and Banetjer) is the Horus name of the third pharaoh of the Second Dynasty of Egypt. The length of his reign is unknown. The Turin Canon suggests an improbable reign of 96 years and Egyptian historian Manetho suggested that Nynetjer's reign lasted 47 years. Egyptologists question both statements as misinterpretations or exaggerations. They generally credit Nynetjer with a reign of either 43 years or 45 years. Their estimation is based on the reconstructions of the well known Palermo Stone inscription reporting the years 7–21, the Cairo Stone inscription reporting the years 36–44. According to different authors, Nynetjer ruled Egypt from c. 2850 BC to 2760 BC or later from c. 2760 BC to 2715 BC.

Name sources 

Nynetjer is one of the best archaeologically attested kings of the 2nd dynasty. His name appears in inscriptions on stone vessels and clay sealings in large numbers from his tomb at Sakkara. A large number of artifacts bearing his name were also found in the tomb of king Peribsen at Abydos and in the galleries beneath the step pyramid of king Djoser. However, the datings of some inscriptions, especially those made of black ink, caused some problems. Writing experts and archaeologists such as Ilona Regulski point out that the ink inscriptions are of a somewhat later date than the stone and seal inscriptions. She dates the ink markings to the reigns of kings such as Khasekhemwy and Djoser and assumes that the artifacts originated from Abydos. In fact, alabaster vessels and earthen jars with black ink inscriptions with very similar font design showing Nynetjer's name were found in Peribsen's tomb.

Nynetjer's name also appears on a rock inscription near Abu Handal in Lower Nubia. This might represent a clue that Nynetjer sent a military expedition into this region, though the inscription only provides limited information.

Identity 
Nynetjer is commonly identified with the Ramesside cartouche names Banetjer from the Abydos King List, Banetjeru from the Sakkara table and Netjer-ren from the Royal Canon of Turin. The Palermo Stone inscription presents an unusual goldname of Nynetjer: Ren-nebu, meaning "golden offspring" or "golden calf". This name appears already on artefacts surviving from Nynetjer's lifetime and Egyptologists such as Wolfgang Helck and Toby Wilkinson think that it could be some kind of forerunner of the golden-Horus-name that was established in the royal titulature at the beginning of 3rd dynasty under king Djoser.

Reign 

Most of the information known about Nynetjer's reign are found on the main fragments of the Annal Stone of the 5th dynasty. The Palermo Stone lists the following events:

 7th year: Escort of Horus (3rd cattle count)...(rest is missing)
 8th year: Appearance of the king; "stretching the cords" (a ceremony for a foundation) for "Hor-Ren". Flood level: 1.57 metres.
 9th year: Escort of Horus (4th cattle count). Flood level: 1.09 metres
 10th year: Appearance of the king of Lower- and Upper Egypt; "Race of the Apis bull" (pḥrr Ḥp). Flood level: 1.09 metres.
 11th year: Escort of Horus (5th cattle count). Flood level: 1.98 metres.
 12th year: Appearance of the king of Lower Egypt; second celebration of the Sokar feast. Flood level: 1.92 metres.
 13th year: Escort of Horus (6th cattle count). Flood level: 0.52 metres.
 14th year: First celebration of "Hor-seba-pet" (Horus the star in heaven); Destruction/Foundation of the cities of "Schem-Re" (The sun has come) and "Ha" (The northern city)(The reading of this text passage is the subject of much discussion, since the hieroglyphic sign of a hoe as used here can mean either 'Destruction' or 'Foundation'.) Flood level: 2.15 metres.
 15th year: Escort of Horus (7th cattle count). Flood level: 2.15 metres.
 16th year: Appearance of the king of Lower Egypt; second "Race of the Apis bull" (pḥrr Ḥp). Flood level: 1.92 metres.
 17th year: Escort of Horus (8th cattle count). Flood level: 2.40 metres.
 18th year: Appearance of the king of Lower Egypt; third celebration of the Sokar feast. Flood level: 2.21 metres.
 19th year: Escort of Horus (9th cattle count). Flood level: 2.25 metres.
 20th year: Appearance of the king of Lower Egypt; offering for the king's mother; celebrating of the "Feast of eternity" (a burial ceremony) Flood level 1.92 metres.
 21st year: Escort of Horus (10th cattle count)...(rest is missing).

The Cairo Stone gives the years 36–44. The surface of the stone slab is damaged. Therefore, most of the events are illegible, except for the "birth" (creation) of an Anubis fetish and parts of a "Appearance of the king of Lower- and Upper Egypt".

The ancient Egyptian historian Manetho, over 2000 years later, called Nynetjer Binôthrís and said that during this ruler's reign "women received the right to gain royal dignity", meaning that women were allowed to reign like a king. Egyptologists such as Walter Bryan Emery assume that this reference was an obituary to the queens Meritneith and Neithhotep from the early 1st dynasty, both of whom are believed to have held the Egyptian throne for several years because their sons were too young to rule. During the reign of Nynetjer the yearly event 'Escort of Horus' was replenished by an event called 'cattle count' which was of highest economic importance to the Egyptian realm, because it was the official implementation of the yearly tax collections. This new state sourcing was held for all times from now on. The event 'Escort of Horus' was abandoned at the beginning of 3rd dynasty.

End of reign 

Egyptologists such as Wolfgang Helck, Nicolas Grimal, Hermann Alexander Schlögl and Francesco Tiradritti believe that Nynetjer left a realm that was suffering from an overly complex state administration and that Nynetjer decided to split Egypt to leave it to his two sons (or, at least, to two successors) who would rule two separate kingdoms, in the hope that the two rulers could better administer the states. 

In contrast, Egyptologists such as Barbara Bell believe that an economic catastrophe such as a famine or a long lasting drought affected Egypt around this time. Therefore, to address the problem of feeding the Egyptian population, Nynetjer split the realm into two and his successors ruled two independent states until the famine came to an end. Bell points to the inscriptions of the Palermo stone, where, in her opinion, the records of the annual Nile floods show constantly low levels during this period. Bell's theory is now refuted by Egyptologists such as Stephan Seidlmayer, who corrected Bell's calculations. Seidlmayer has shown that the annual Nile floods were at their usual levels at Nynetjer's time up to the period of the Old Kingdom. Bell had overlooked that the heights of the Nile floods in the Palermo Stone inscriptions only takes into account the measurements of the nilometers around Memphis, but not elsewhere along the river. Any long-lasting drought is therefore less likely to be an explanation.

It is also unclear if Nynetjer's successor already shared his throne with another ruler, or if the Egyptian state was split at the time of his death. All known king lists such as the Sakkara list, the Turin Canon and the Abydos table list a king Wadjenes as Nynetjer's immediate successor and as the predecessor of a king called Senedj. After Senedj, the kinglists differ from each other regarding successors. While the Sakkara list and the Turin canon mention the kings Neferka(ra) I, Neferkasokar and Hudjefa I as immediate successors, the Abydos list skips them and lists a king Djadjay (identical with king Khasekhemwy). If Egypt was already divided when Senedj gained the throne, kings like Sekhemib and Peribsen would have ruled Upper Egypt, whilst Senedj and his successors, Neferka(ra) and Hudjefa I, would have ruled Lower Egypt. The division of Egypt was brought to an end by king Khasekhemwy.

Tomb 
 
The unusually large mastaba tomb of the high official Ruaben (or Ni-Ruab), mastaba S2302, was once thought to be Nynetjer's tomb, until the true burial site of the king was found. The earlier misinterpretations were caused by the large amount of clay seals with Nynetjer's serekh name that were found in Ruaben's mastaba. Therefore, Mastaba S2302 belongs to Ruaben and Ruaben held his office during the reign of Nynetjer.

Nynetjer's tomb, Gallery Tomb B, lies beneath the cortege passage of the Unas-necropolis at Sakkara and measures 94x106 metres. The entrance ramp leads 25 metres deep into three galleries heading East-West, extending into a maze-like system of doorways, vestibules and corridors. The Deutsches Archäologisches Institut (DAI) accomplished five excavations and found out, that Nynetjer's tomb shows great architectural similarities to the Gallery Tomb A, which is thought to be either Raneb's or Hotepsekhemwy's burial site. This led the DAI to the conclusion that Nynetjer was inspired by his predecessor's tombs. 56 flint knives, 44 razors, 44 further blades and wine and beer jars were found. The southern gallery surprisingly was nearly undisturbed and contained many royal objects surviving from Nynetjer's lifetime, such as more than 50 sealed wine jars, carrying nets, storage boxes made of wood and decorated alabaster bottles. Some of the wine jars originated from the tombs of the late 1st Dynasty. In another gallery the mummy masks and a woman's coffin of the Ramesside era were found. Nynetjer's tomb was therefore partially re-used in later times. The main burial chamber was located at the southern-west end of the tomb, but the whole burial site is highly unstable and is in danger of collapsing.

References

External links
 Francesco Raffaele: Ninetjer (nswt-bity Nynetjer)

29th-century BC Pharaohs
28th-century BC Pharaohs
Pharaohs of the Second Dynasty of Egypt
3rd-millennium BC births
3rd-millennium BC deaths